Canadian federal elections have provided the following results in New Brunswick.

Regional Profile
New Brunswick results in federal elections are divided among geographical and linguistic lines: The Liberals fare better in the predominantly francophone eastern and northern sections of the province, while the anglophone south and west has historically tended to favour the Conservatives. In 1993, Saint John was one of only two ridings in the country to go Progressive Conservative, electing Elsie Wayne. The Conservatives improved their seat count in each election from 2004 to 2011, until the Liberals swept New Brunswick (along with the rest of Atlantic Canada) in the 2015 election. In 2019, the Conservatives were able to regain 3 seats, while the Greens made history by picking up Fredericton, their first seat outside B.C. Their vote percentage almost quadrupled to 17%, replacing the NDP as the main third party.

Votes by party throughout time

2019 - 43rd General Election

2015 - 42nd General Election

2011 - 41st General Election

2008 - 40th General Election

2006 - 39th General Election
Conservative Mike Allen defeated incumbent MP Andy Savoy in Tobique—Mactaquac. In the open seat of Moncton—Riverview—Dieppe, formerly held by Claudette Bradshaw, Brian Murphy kept the seat for the Liberals. There was no change elsewhere.

2004 - 38th General Election
The Liberals held three seats in the Anglophone south (Fredericton, Fundy and Tobique-Mactaquac), believed to be most vulnerable to the Conservatives.  Despite heavy targeting, the Conservatives only managed to reclaim Fundy from John Herron (who defected from the old PC party in 2003).  They lost the adjacent seat of Saint John, vacated by the retiring Elsie Wayne, making for a net Liberal gain.

2000 - 37th General Election

Elections in New Brunswick
New Brunswick